The rank of Commissioner in The Salvation Army is the second highest rank attainable by Officers in the organisation, and many of the Army's Territorial Commanders and even the Chief of the Staff hold this rank (the highest rank in The Salvation Army, the rank of General, is by election).  The rank of Commissioner has been an active rank since 1880, and is one of the original ranks created by General William Booth, the first appointed Commissioner being George Scott Railton.

Purpose

Commissioners are given the rank for a number of reasons, being given command of a Territory being the most common. Other reasons may include appointments to International Headquarters Secretarial positions or other top roles and less commonly other high-responsibility positions throughout the world.

All active Commissioners are called upon to take part in The Salvation Army High Council in which a new General is elected upon the pending retirement or removal of the previous General. Notably, the only time a General has been forcibly removed from office was at the first High Council in 1929 when Bramwell Booth was deposed.

In 1984, spouses of Commissioners, who previously were not promoted to that rank when their partners were, were given the rank in their own right, effectively increasing the amount of Commissioners by two-thirds.

Notable Commissioners
Theodore Kitching
George Scott Railton
Frederick Booth-Tucker
Arthur Booth-Clibborn
Charles Jeffries
Elijah Cadman
Israel Gaither
Samuel Logan Brengle
Catherine Bramwell-Booth
T. Henry Howard
John Lawley
William Ridsdel
Helen Clifton
Barry Swanson
William A. Roberts
Walter Stanley Cottrill
Anna Hannevik
Harry Read
James Dowdle

See also
Generals of The Salvation Army
Chief of the Staff of The Salvation Army
High Council of The Salvation Army
Officer of The Salvation Army
Soldier of The Salvation Army

References

 
 
The Salvation Army